Jan Bohuszewicz (born 7 February 1878 in Osowiec; died 13 February 1935 in Santa Margherita Ligure) was a Polish painter.

Jan Bohuszewicz studied painting with Józef Rapacki in Warsaw. He took an active part in the Revolution of 1905, following which he moved to Zakopane, to flee repression. Due to health problems, he settled in Genoa, from which he went on numerous artist travels inter alia to Venice, Liguria, Chioggia, and Piedmont.

In 1920, he visited Poland during an independent exhibition at the Society of the Incentive for Fine Arts (Towarzystwo Zachęty Sztuk Pięknych). Two years later, his artwork was exhibited at the Association France-Pologne, were about fifty of his artworks were put up on display as part of the exhibition.

Selected paintings

References

External links

1878 births
1935 deaths
19th-century Polish painters
19th-century Polish male artists
20th-century Polish painters
20th-century Polish male artists
People from Warmian-Masurian Voivodeship
Polish male painters
Emigrants from the Russian Empire to Italy